Trichambaram Temple is a Krishna temple located at Taliparamba in the Kannur district of Kerala, South India. The main deity of the temple is Krishna after "Kamsavadham", sitting in Raudra posture (ferocious posture). This temple is also called North Guruvayoor, since it is located to the north of Guruvayoor Temple. The temple is managed by TTK Devaswom (Taliparamba, Thrichambaram, Kanjirangad Devasom) which is a major devaswom board administering around 15 temples in Kannur District of Kerala.

The temple is mentioned in the 11th century CE Sanskrit kāvya Mūṣikavaṃśa”.

The sanctum has carvings and murals from the 15th and 16th centuries.  In the temple complex there is also a shrine dedicated to Durga which is in middle of a tank. This shrine is one of the 108 Durgalayas of Ancient Kerala. There are shrines for Shiva, Ganapathi, Sastha, Vishvaksena and Snake deities near the temple complex. There are three ponds near this temple.

Festival and Thitambu Nriththam 

The annual temple festival (Utsavam) is a fortnight-long event beginning on Kumbham 22 of Malayalam calendar (which generally falls on 6 March) every year with the Kodiyettam (hoisting of a religious flag) and ends on Meenam 6 (which generally falls on 20 March) with Koodipiriyal (ending of this festival). In between these dates, for 11 days, Thitambu Nriththam (a sort of dance with the idols of Krishna and Balarama) is held at Pookoth Nada (1 km  from Trichambaram temple).

See also
Taliparamba
Parassinikkadavu
Parassinikkadavu Temple
Muthappan temple
Kunnathoor Padi
Rajarajeshwara Temple
Temples of Kerala
Trichambaram inscription

References

https://archive.today/GjTcm

Hindu temples in Kannur district
Taliparamba